Shara - Sharat Elajayez  is a Syrian village located in Sinjar Nahiyah in Maarrat al-Nu'man District, Idlib.  According to the Syria Central Bureau of Statistics (CBS), Shara - Sharat Elajayez had a population of 630 in the 2004 census.

References 

Populated places in Maarat al-Numan District